Will Albright is an American racecar driver from Graham, North Carolina. He made one start in NASCAR in 1950. He finished 19th at the Daytona Beach Road Course. He finished 43 of 48 laps.

Motorsports career results

NASCAR 
(key) (Bold – Pole position awarded by qualifying time. Italics – Pole position earned by points standings or practice time. * – Most laps led.)

Grand National Series

References

External links
 

Living people
People from Graham, North Carolina
Racing drivers from North Carolina
NASCAR drivers
Year of birth missing (living people)